David Vanacore is an American television music composer. Dubbed by television music industry insiders as 'The King of Reality', David Vanacore is the composer behind many acclaimed series as Survivor, The Apprentice, Big Brother, Ink Master , American Chopper, Dirty Jobs, Hell's Kitchen, Wipeout, Whale Wars, and hundreds more.

Vanacore has won ASCAP's Most Performed Themes and Most Performed Underscore awards every year since 2005.

Vanacore began studying piano at the age of seven. For years he worked as a studio session pianist/keyboardist and toured with Cher among other artists. He studied composition, orchestration and conducting at Cal State University and the Dick Grove School of Music. A chance meeting with television composer Mike Post led to an offer as his studio keyboard player, which introduced him to the world of music supervision for television.

Vanacore first major breakout as a TV composer occurred when he landed a job with Mark Burnett for the first season of Survivor'' in 2000. At that time, Reality TV was new to audiences around the world. As a result, Vanacore was able to craft a style of music which today is commonly used for unscripted TV. As his success and workload increased, he began to hire composers in order to keep up with the high demand of music. His venture as a one-man composer blossomed into a full-fledged composing house known as Vanacore Music, which produced music for unscripted television series.

Today, as President & CEO of Vanacore Music and co-owner with his wife Lisa, Vanacore continues to provide music for major network and cable shows in collaboration with his team of composers and producers at his music production facility in Los Angeles and recently established offices in Santa Monica and New York City.

References

External links
 

Living people
American television composers
Place of birth missing (living people)
Year of birth missing (living people)
American chief executives
California State University alumni